Phyllis A. Wallace (1921–1993) was a distinguished African American economist and activist, as well as the first woman to receive doctorate of economics at Yale University. Her work tended to focus on racial, as well as gender discrimination in the workplace.

Early life

She was born Annie Rebecca Wallace in Calvert County, Maryland, on June 9, 1921 to John Wallace, a craftsman, and Stevella Wallace. She attended a well ranked yet segregated high school, Frederick Douglass High School, graduating in 1939.

Despite ranking first in her high school class, state law at that time would not allow her to attend the all-white University of Maryland. She attended New York University, receiving a bachelor's degree in economics in 1943, graduating magna cum laude and Phi Beta Kappa.

She later attended Yale University, earning a master's degree in 1944 and a PhD in 1948. A mix of encouragement from her Yale economist professor and work at a federal-defense agency made her decide to pursue a career in international economics.

Career

Her work began studying economic growth in the Soviet Union, but later transferred to a focus in workplace economics, joining the senior staff of Equal Employment Opportunity Commission (EEOC) in 1965. She became a voice for anti-discrimination in the workplace, and was an important part of the anti-workplace-discrimination contingencies of the Civil Rights Act of 1964. Her work shifted again towards economic issues with urban minority youth when she began working for Metropolitan Applied Research Center (MARC).

Wallace joined the faculty of MIT in 1972 as a visiting professor, and was tenured as full professor in 1974, in the Sloan School. Her appointment made her the first woman to gain tenure at Sloan. Wallace retired from active teaching in 1986.

Achievements

Wallace was the first African American and the first female president of the Industrial Relations Research Association. She also garnered several awards for her accomplishments, including National Economic Association's Westerfield Award in 1981, and awards from several universities, including Yale (1980) and Brown (1986).

Bibliography
Books by Wallace include: 
 Pathways to work: Unemployment among black teenage females (1974). Lexington, MA: Lexington Books
Equal Employment Opportunity and the AT & T Case (1976). Cambridge, Mass: M.I.T. Press
 Women, minorities and employment discrimination (1977) Lexington, MA: Lexington Books

 editor, Women in the workplace (1982) Boston, MA: Auburn House
 MBAs on the fast track (1989) New York: Harper and Row

References

External links

1921 births
1993 deaths
African-American activists
African-American economists
New York University alumni
Yale Graduate School of Arts and Sciences alumni
20th-century American economists
People from Calvert County, Maryland
People from Boston
MIT Sloan School of Management faculty
American women economists
Economists from Massachusetts
Economists from Maryland
20th-century African-American women
20th-century African-American people